Sarsfields GAA is a hurling club is based in the Riverstown and Glanmire area of County Cork.  The club plays in the Imokilly division of Cork GAA. They have won six County Championships, 1951, 1957, 2008, 2010, 2012 and 2014. They have also won three Minor County Championships, 2007, 2008 and 2014. The club derives its name for the Irish Jacobite and soldier Patrick Sarsfield, 1st Earl of Lucan.

County Championship history

While the club reached a number of championship semi-finals prior to 1936, it wasn't until the 1936 Cork Senior Hurling Championship before the club contested their first final. They lost out to Glen Rovers that year. 1940 would be the next time they would make final, again losing out to Glen Rovers. Another final loss this time to St. Finbarr's in the 1947 Cork Senior Hurling Championship followed.
 
During the 1950s, Sarsfields won the Cork Senior Hurling Championship twice, beating Glen Rovers in the 1951 final, and UCC in the 1957 competition. They also made the final in 1953.

Sarsfields have been in four finals since, 1989 and 1997, where they lost and 2008 when they beat Bride Rovers by 1 point. In 2010, they defeated Glen Rovers by 2 points to win their fourth county title. Additional titles followed in 2012 and 2014.

Honours

 Cork Senior Hurling Championship Winners (6) 1951, 1957, 2008, 2010, 2012, 2014 Runners-Up: 1909, 1936, 1940, 1947, 1953, 1989, 1997, 2009 2013, 2015
 Cork Minor Hurling Championship Winners (6) 1931, 1953, 1954, 2007, 2008, 2014. Runners up 2015.
 Cork Premier Under-21 A Hurling Championship Winners (4) 1975, 2003, 2017, 2019
 Cork Junior Hurling Championship Winners (1) 1937  Runners-Up 2016
 East Cork Junior A Hurling Championship Winners (4) 1937, 1953, 2004, 2016

Notable players
 Teddy McCarthy
 Paddy Barry
 Alan Lotty
 John Considine
 Tadhg Murphy
 Bertie Óg Murphy
 Kieran Murphy
 Peter Queally
 Michael Cussen
 Daniel Kearney
 Cian McCarthy
 Conor O'Sullivan 
 Pat Ryan
 Jack O'Connor

References

External links
Sarsfields GAA site

Gaelic games clubs in County Cork
Hurling clubs in County Cork